Trhanov is a municipality and village in Domažlice District in the Plzeň Region of the Czech Republic. It has about 500 inhabitants.

Administrative parts
Village of Pila is an administrative part of Trhanov.

References

Villages in Domažlice District